Liu Yin (born August 19, 1981 in Harbin, Heilongjiang; usually referred to in the media as Yin Liu) is a Chinese curler from Harbin. For many years she played third on the Chinese national team skipped by Wang Bingyu.

Curling career

2002–2009 
Liu has played internationally for China since 2002, when she was an alternate on the team at the  when she had only been curling for two years.

In 2004, she was a full member of the team. The team finished 7th.

For the 2006–07 season, Liu threw last rocks for the team while Wang held the broom as skip. The season included their first Pacific Championship, an Asian Winter Games bronze medal and a disappointing 7th-place finish at the 2007 World Women's Curling Championship.

At the 2007 Pacific Championships, Liu was back throwing second stones when the team won their second Pacific Championship. She was promoted to the third position for the 2008 Ford World Women's Curling Championship in which she earned a silver medal- China's first medal at a World Championship. Since then, Liu has played third for the team. She won her third Pacific Championship in 2008, which was followed by a gold medal at the 2009 Winter Universiade and, most importantly, by a World Championship gold medal at the 2009 World Women's Championship.

2010–2014 
Liu Yin competed for Team China at the 2010 Winter Olympics in Vancouver, British Columbia. Her team qualified for the playoffs, but in the Semifinal match they lost to eventual Gold medalists Team Sweden. In the Bronze medal match they faced Team Switzerland skipped by Torino Silver medalist Mirjam Ott. They Chinese pulled off a 12 -6 victory and became the first curling team from an Asian nation to win an Olympic medal.

Just a month after the Olympics, Liu and Team China competed at the 2010 World Championship in Swift Current, Saskatchewan, where they finished a disappointing 7th out of 12 teams. Later in 2010 Liu returned to the Pacific Curling Championship, losing to Korea in the final to earn a silver medal for the third time.

Liu played in the 2011 World Championship, where Team China defeated Team Denmark for the bronze medal. After World's she took some time away from curling, missing the Pacific Championships in 2011 and the World Championships in 2012. Liu returned to international competition in 2012 at the Pacific Championships, where her team won the gold medal for a fifth time.

At the 2013 World Championship Liu and Team China struggled, finishing 9th with a record of 4–7. In the fall, Team China settled for silver at the 2013 Pacific Championships. Playing Korea in the finals, China was up 8-6 only to give up 3 points in the 10th end. 

China failed to automatically qualify for the 2014 Winter Olympics and so had to compete in the qualification event to try to earn one of the last two spots. Liu's team won the event, defeating Japan in the final 7–6. At the Olympic games in Sochi Liu failed to make the playoffs, finishing with a record of 4–5.

Personal life 
Liu married in 2011. Her husband is an ice hockey coach.

Teammates
2010 Vancouver Olympic Games

2014 Sochi Olympic Games

Wang Bingyu, Skip
Liu Yin, Third
Yue Qingshuang, Second
Zhou Yan, Lead

References

External links
 

1981 births
Living people
Chinese female curlers
Curlers at the 2010 Winter Olympics
Curlers at the 2014 Winter Olympics
Olympic bronze medalists for China
Olympic curlers of China
Sportspeople from Harbin
World curling champions
Olympic medalists in curling
Medalists at the 2010 Winter Olympics
Asian Games medalists in curling
Curlers at the 2003 Asian Winter Games
Curlers at the 2007 Asian Winter Games
Medalists at the 2003 Asian Winter Games
Medalists at the 2007 Asian Winter Games
Asian Games bronze medalists for China
Universiade medalists in curling
Pacific-Asian curling champions
Universiade gold medalists for China
Competitors at the 2009 Winter Universiade
21st-century Chinese women